Greenwich Presbyterian Church and Cemetery is a historic Presbyterian church and cemetery located at 9510 Burwell Road in Greenwich, Prince William County, Virginia. It was started in 1859, and is a one-story, gable-roofed brick church building in the Gothic Revival style.  It features two pointed-arched front doors, decorative buttresses on the side walls, and large, pointed, arched windows on the front and side walls. It has a wooden church tower with a louvred belfry and a shingle-covered spire topped by a weathervane. The adjacent cemetery has at least 100 headstones and includes the graves of several American Civil War soldiers, including Captain Bradford Smith Hoskins, a colorful Englishman who rode with Colonel John S. Mosby.

It was added to the National Register of Historic Places in 1989.

References

Presbyterian churches in Virginia
Protestant Reformed cemeteries
Churches on the National Register of Historic Places in Virginia
Gothic Revival church buildings in Virginia
Churches completed in 1859
Buildings and structures in Prince William County, Virginia
National Register of Historic Places in Prince William County, Virginia